Maccagno con Pino e Veddasca (Lombard: Maccàgn cun Pin e Vedàsca) is a comune in the province of Varese, in Lombardy, Italy, that was formed on 25 May 2014 from fusion of the communes of Maccagno, Pino sulla Sponda del Lago Maggiore and Veddasca.

A referendum to create this comune was held on 1 December 2013. The referendum was passed with 77% yes and 33% no votes.

Maccagno  con Pino e Veddasca borders the following municipalities: Brissago (Switzerland), Cannobio (VB), Curiglia con Monteviasco, Dumenza, Gambarogno (Switzerland), Luino, Ronco sopra Ascona (Switzerland), Tronzano Lago Maggiore.

References

Cities and towns in Lombardy